A khalat  ( / ALA-LC: xalat), also known as khelat, is a loose, long-sleeved outer silk or cotton robe common in Central Asia and South Asia and worn both by men and women, although in differing styles.

History 
Historically, richly adorned khalats have been used as honorific awards, similarly to mantle. The word khalat/khilat was also used to denote the ceremony of awarding the honorific robe. Such social aspects of clothing have been known in many societies. By the 19th century in British India the word khillat had come to mean any gift of money or goods awarded by the Government of India in return for service from tributary princes, khans and tribal leaders.

Cultural variation

Central Asia 

Central Asian khalats can be a thin, decorative garment, or thick, full length robe, and good protection from both exposure to heat and light and the cold.

Eastern Europe 
The word khalat is one of many borrowings to be found in Russian, where it has come to be a generic term for various robes.

In Romanian the word is halat is used, meaning dressing gown, bathrobe, smock, camouflage cloak, etc. A similar garment is known as Chapan in Turkic.

The khalat (sometimes called khlat in Yiddish) was also worn by Ashkenazi Jewish men in Eastern Europe, until the early 20th century. These were long, close-fitting coats with shawl collars and pockets. In Jewish communities, these were cotton garments meant for everyday wear; more luxurious versions were made of velvet or silk and worn for Shabbat or other holidays.

See also 
Kaftan
Chapan
Robe of honour

References

Further reading 
 Stewart Gordon, "Robes of Honour: Khilat in Pre-Colonial and Colonial India". Oxford University Press, 2003, 

Pakistani clothing
Indian clothing
Bangladeshi clothing
Robes and cloaks